Vyacheslav Litovchenko (born January 7, 1990) is a Russian professional ice hockey forward who currently plays for HC Sibir Novosibirsk of the Kontinental Hockey League (KHL).

Playing career
Litovchenko has formerly played with Amur Khabarovsk. Having spent the first 13 professional seasons of his career exclusively with Amur Khabarovsk, Litovchenko left as a free agent prior to the 2018–19 season, agreeing to a one-year contract with Avtomobilist Yekaterinburg on May 4, 2018.

After three seasons with Avtomobilist, Litovchenko left as a free agent and joined his third KHL club, HC Sibir Novosibirsk, on a one-year contract on 1 May 2021.

References

External links

1990 births
Living people
Amur Khabarovsk players
Avtomobilist Yekaterinburg players
Russian ice hockey forwards
HC Sibir Novosibirsk players
Sportspeople from Khabarovsk
Yermak Angarsk players